Jay Scott Emler (born May 25, 1949) is a former Republican member of the Kansas Senate, representing the 35th district from 2001 until 2014.  He previously worked as a Municipal Judge in Lindsborg. Emler was elected by his colleagues to serve as majority leader of the Senate, following Derek Schmidt's election as Kansas Attorney General. Emler assumed the position when the Senate convened January 10, 2011. Emler accepted an appointment to the Kansas Corporation Commission and resigned his seat in the Kansas Senate in 2014; he was succeeded by Clark Shultz.

He lives in Lindsborg, is married to Lorraine Emler and practices law in McPherson.

Committee assignments
Sen. Emler works on these legislative committees:
 Ways and Means
 Joint Committee on Kansas Security (vice-chair)
 Commerce
 Joint Committee on Pensions, Investments and Benefits
 Joint Committee on State Building Construction
 Utilities

Major donors
Some of the top contributors to Sen. Emler's 2008 campaign, according to the National Institute on Money in State Politics:
 Kansas Republican Senatorial Committee, Greater Kansas City Chamber of Commerce, Kansas Contractors Association, Koch Industries, Pioneer Communications

Energy and natural resources companies were his largest donor group.

References

External links
Kansas Senate Biography
Project Vote Smart profile
 Campaign contributions: 2000, 2002, 2004, 2006, 2008
 Sen. Emler's website

Republican Party Kansas state senators
Living people
1949 births
People from Lindsborg, Kansas
People from McPherson, Kansas
21st-century American politicians
Naval Postgraduate School alumni
University of Denver alumni
Bethany College (Kansas) alumni